Mahabir Lal Vishwakarma (born 1 January 1936) is an Indian politician, educationist and the former Member of parliament. He was elected during the 11th general elections of India conducted in 1996. He represented Hazaribagh parliamentary constituency from 1996 to 1998.

Life and background 
Vishwakarma was born on 1 January 1936 in British India and raised in Noora area of Hazaribagh of Bihar state. He did Master of Science and Diploma in education at Bihar University, and then Tilka Manjhi Bhagalpur University and Banaras Hindu University in Varanasi Uttar Pradesh. After completing his education, he then worked as a teacher and educationist.

Career
Vishwakarma was initially serving as a teacher and then established his associations with Bhartiya Janata Party to contest 11th Lok Sabha elections. He was elected as the member of parliament and remained in office from 1996 to 1998.

In 2004 Indian general election and 14th Lok Sabha, the party declined his ticket, citing "He made unsuitable efforts" during the election campaign against its official candidate Yashwant Sinha. After resigning from the party, he contested as a nonpartisan candidate but was declared "defeated".

Personal life
Vishwakarma was born to "Latoo Mistry" and married to "Sita Devi" on 21 May 1954. The couple has four daughters and two sons.

References

1936 births
India MPs 1996–1997
People from Bihar
People from Hazaribagh district
Living people
Indian politicians
Tilka Manjhi Bhagalpur University alumni